This article lists political parties in Catalonia represented in Parliament, their ideologies, leaders, number of MPs and their positions on Catalan independence.

Parties and coalitions in the Catalan Parliament

Smaller parties

References

 
Catalonia
Political parties